Jena-Göschwitz station (called Göschwitz (Saale) until December 2010) is a railway station in city of Jena in the German state of Thuringia. It is 152.21 metres above sea level and is located 32.22 km from Großheringen on the Saal Railway and 27.50 from Weimar station on the Weimar–Gera railway. It was opened on 1 July 1876. It is classified by Deutsche Bahn as a category 4 station.

History 
The station was originally a modest establishment with three tracks. In 1879, the Saal Railway Company opened the current platform 2.

During World War II, the facilities of the station was not very badly damaged, in contrast to stations such as Jena Saale or Saalfeld. Between 1965 and 1973, the tracks were thoroughly refurbished by the East German Railways and the duplication of the adjacent sections of the line were restored (one track and the original electrification equipment had been removed after the war for reparations to the Soviet Union).

The entrance building of the Weimar-Gera Railway Company (Weimar-Geraer Eisenbahn-Gesellschaft) was shared with the Saal Railway Company. It was rebuilt in 1959.

Between 1994 and 1996, Göschwitz station was rebuilt when the Saal Railway was electrified and overhead line equipment was installed for the second time.

Station name 

In 1923, the city of Jena requested that the station be renamed from "Göschwitz" to "Jena Süd" (Jena South), but this was rejected. In 1953, East German Railways rejected a proposal by the  mayor of Göschwitz to change the name to "Göschwitz/Saale" or "Jena Süd". The first option was preferred, because there was no proposal to re-incorporate Göschwitz in the city of Jena. Since 1969 Göschwitz has been incorporated in Jena, but the name of the station remained unchanged, so the city of Jena often submitted proposals for a name change to "Jena-Göschwitz”. In December 2010, Deutsche Bahn announced the station would be renamed "Jena-Göschwitz".

Notes

References

External links 

Railway stations in Thuringia
Buildings and structures in Jena
Railway stations in Germany opened in 1876